Álvaro Pérez Treviño (8 May 1930 - 26 April 2016) was a Mexican politician, former member of the extinct Authentic Party of the Mexican Revolution, of which he was presidential candidate in 1994 election, in which he obtained 0.55% of the votes.

References

2016 deaths
Authentic Party of the Mexican Revolution politicians
Candidates in the 1994 Mexican presidential election
Candidates in the 2000 Mexican presidential election
1930 births